Matsubayashi (written: 松林) is a Japanese surname. Notable people with the surname include:

, Japanese footballer
, Japanese film director

See also
Matsubayashi-ryū, an Okinawan karate style

Japanese-language surnames